Alien Brigade is a horizontally-scrolling rail shooter released by Atari Corporation in 1990 for the Atari 7800. Similar in style to Operation Wolf, Alien Brigade tells the story of a soldier battling with alien invaders that take over the bodies of fallen soldiers. 

Despite being released late in the Atari 7800's life cycle, Atari Corporation made more efforts to market the game than it had with other Atari 7800 titles. The game had its own print advertisement and was referenced in Atari's 1990 shooter, Planet Smashers (Alien Brigade would return the favor by advertising Planet Smashers).

Alien Brigade is 144K in size, making it one of the largest commercially released Atari 7800 games.

Gameplay 
The game is played from a first-person point of view and scrolls horizontally in two directions as various enemy creatures, possessed soldiers, human vehicles and alien vehicles attack the player character. Alien Brigade can either be played with the Atari 7800 joystick or with an Atari light gun.

The game has five levels and four difficulty modes. The initial mission is to rescue hostages from an enemy camp, but the game then progresses to a waterfront battle, an underwater melee, a showdown in an underground mine, and then a final mountaintop battle. Adding to the challenge, the player must be careful not to shoot innocent bystanders.

Between levels, the player is briefed by the commanding officer, who advises of the situation and rates the player's performance in the level.

Reception 
Alien Brigade was reviewed in the September 1991 issue of Atari's own Atari Explorer magazine. Funkmaster V of Wrestling With Ghosts reviewed the game on Atari 7800 Forever and gave it a 4 out of 5, and ranks it as the 10th best officially licensed game on the system.

Re-releases 

Evercade (2020)
Atari VCS (2021 console) (2022)

References

External links 
  Alien Brigade manual
 Alien Brigade at AtariAge

1990 video games
Atari 7800 games
Atari 7800-only games
Light gun games
Rail shooters
Video games developed in the United States